Garmsir (from Persian گرمسیر, meaning "hot place") is the center of Garmsir District in Helmand Province, Afghanistan. The major road at Garmsir is Route 605. The hospital is called Hazar Juft Comprehensive Health Clinic.

Prince Harry spent time in the village during his 2008 period in the country.

Climate
Garmsir has a hot desert climate (Köppen BWh), characterised by little precipitation and high variation between summer and winter temperatures. The average temperature in Garmsir is 21.3 °C, while the annual precipitation averages 83 mm. July is the hottest month of the year with an average temperature of 33.8 °C. The coldest month January has an average temperature of 8.6 °C.

Conflict

Garmsir was the scene of heavy fighting during April–September 2008 when U.S. Marines from the 24th MEU arrived to reinforce British and Afghan forces.

In July 2009, Marines taking part in Operation Khanjar met little or no resistance initially. By July 5, elements of the 2nd Battalion, 8th Marines were engaged in heavy fighting with Taliban forces.

Notable people
Muhammad bin Bakhtiyar Khalji, founder of the Khalji dynasty of Bengal (1204–1227)

See also
Camp Dwyer
Forward Operating Base Delhi
JTAC Cornet Harry Wales
Mullah Abdul Karim (Guantanamo detainee 520)
Operation Azada Wosa
Operation Be Free
Helmand Province campaign

See also
 Helmand Province

References

External links
Widow Six Seven 28 February 2008
Taliban: We Knew About Prince Newsweek 1 March 2008
Marines launch assault in Afghanistan MSNBC 29 April 2008
US Marines, British forces in major new Afghan operation AFP 29 April 2008

Populated places in Helmand Province
Wars involving the Taliban